Kpuéré is a department or commune of Noumbiel Province in south-eastern Burkina Faso. Its capital lies at the town of Kpuéré.

The 2 only other villages are Dianbile And Koanta

Administrative Subdivisions 
The department of Kpuéré is subdivided into 2 Subprefectures.

References

Departments of Burkina Faso
Noumbiel Province